is a Japanese company developing and manufacturing car audio, video, navigation and control systems. The headquarters is located in Kobe, Hyōgo Prefecture, Japan. As its name shows, Denso Ten belongs to the Denso group led by Denso Corp., which is the second-largest auto parts supplier in the world.

The parent company was changed from Fujitsu to Denso on November 1, 2017.

The major products of Denso Ten are the Eclipse brand car audio and navigation systems. It is also a supplier of OEM products to major automobile companies in Japan and the U.S.

DENSO TEN AMERICA Limited, the U.S. headquarters, is located in Novi, Michigan is a subsidiary of Denso Ten that supplies products to the U.S. market and industry.

Name
The Ten in the company's name does not refer to the number 10, but rather comes from the Chinese character Ten (天), meaning heaven in Chinese and Japanese.

History
Fujitsu Ten was created in 1972 when it was spun out by Fujitsu Limited. It took with it the automotive and radio electronics departments. The intention was that creating a separate company would give more focus to these areas.  The automotive and radio departments were themselves the result of a merger between Fujitsu Limited and Kobe Industries Corp. in 1968.

In September 2016, Denso agreed with Fujitsu to purchase the stock of Fujitsu Ten. The deal was made on November 1, 2017, and its name was changed to Denso Ten.

Notable staff
A Nobel prize winner, Leo Esaki (江崎 玲於奈 Esaki Reona), worked at Kobe Kogyo (神戸工業 Kōbe Kōgyō), which is the preceding company of Fujitsu Ten before it changed its name to Fujitsu Ten.

Eclipse 
Eclipse is the brand name for its GPS car navigation and audio system products.

TMC 
Eclipse AVN726EE, AVN726EA and AVN440 include TMC.

References

External links
 Denso Ten Ltd.
 Eclipse
 Fujitsu Ten España

Fujitsu
Toyota Group
Electronics companies established in 1972
1972 establishments in Japan
Manufacturing companies based in Kobe
Automotive companies of Japan
Navigation system companies
In-car entertainment
Electronics companies of Japan
2017 mergers and acquisitions